The 11th National Television Awards ceremony was held at the Royal Albert Hall on 25 October 2005 and was hosted by Sir Trevor McDonald.

Awards

This is the last time (until 2018) that the National Television Awards would be held on a Tuesday.

References

National Television Awards
National Television Awards
National Television Awards
2005 in London
National Television Awards
National Television Awards